Mosken is a small uninhabited rocky island in Værøy Municipality in Nordland county, Norway.  The  island is located in the Lofoten archipelago about halfway between the islands of Værøya to the south and Moskenesøya to the north.  The Moskenstraumen maelstrom—one of the most powerful in the world—is located on the north side of the island of Mosken.  Historically, the island was used for grazing sheep in both the summer and the winter.

Media gallery

See also
 List of islands of Norway

References

Lofoten
Værøy
Islands of Nordland
Uninhabited islands of Norway